Jarrod Shaw (born January 7, 1988) is an American football offensive guard who is currently a free agent. He signed with the Cleveland Browns as an undrafted free agent in 2011. He played college football at Tennessee.

Early years
He attended Northside High School in Lafayette, Louisiana. He was a Two-time All-District  and All- State while in high school.

College career
He played college football at Tennessee where he started 6 games in his junior season and 13 games in his senior season. While at Tennessee, Shaw played all five positions along the offensive line during his career.

Professional career

Cleveland Browns
On July 26, 2011, he signed with the Cleveland Browns as an undrafted free agent. On September 3, 2011, he was released. On September 4, he was signed to the practice squad. On January 3, 2012, he was signed to a reserve/future contract after spending the 2011 NFL season on the Cleveland Browns practice squad. On August 31, 2012, he was released. On September 1, he was signed to the practice squad. On October 22, 2012, he was promoted to the active roster.
He was waived by the Cleveland Browns on September 1, 2013.

Oakland Raiders
Shaw was signed by the Oakland Raiders as a reserve/future free agent on January 13, 2014. On August 31, 2014, Shaw was released.

References

External links
Tennessee Volunteers bio 
Cleveland Browns bio

1988 births
Living people
Sportspeople from Lafayette, Louisiana
Players of American football from Louisiana
American football offensive guards
Tennessee Volunteers football players
Cleveland Browns players
Oakland Raiders players